The following are the national records in speed skating in Finland maintained by Suomen Luisteluliitto.

Men

Women

References

External links
 Suomen Luisteluliitto website

National records in speed skating
speed skating
Records
Speed skating
Speed skating-related lists